Catesby ap Roger Jones (April 15, 1821 – June 21, 1877) was an officer in the U.S. Navy who became a commander in the Confederate Navy during the American Civil War. He assumed command of  during the Battle of Hampton Roads and engaged  in the historic first battle of the two ironclads.

Biography
Jones was born in Clarke County, Virginia, son of Major General Roger ap Catesby Jones and Mary Ann Mason. His mother was a lineal descendant of William Byrd II of Westover and Robert "King" Carter, making her also a cousin of General Robert E. Lee. His uncle was Thomas ap Catesby Jones, a naval officer during the War of 1812 and Mexican–American War. Jones was appointed a midshipman in the United States Navy in 1836, and served extensively at sea, receiving promotion to the rank of lieutenant in 1849. During the 1850s, Jones was involved in development work on navy weapons and served as ordnance officer on the new steam frigate  when she began active service in 1856.

When Virginia left the Union in April 1861, Lieutenant Jones resigned his U.S. Navy commission, joining the Virginia State Navy soon thereafter and becoming a Confederate Navy lieutenant in June. Later in 1862, he commanded a shore battery at Drewry's Bluff, on the James River, and the gunboat  while she was under construction at Saffold, Georgia.

For his "gallant and meritorious conduct" during the battles of Hampton Roads and Drewry's Bluff, Jones was promoted to the rank of commander on April 29, 1863. Jones was sent to Selma, Alabama, to take charge of the Ordnance Works there. For the rest of the Civil War, he supervised the manufacture of badly needed heavy guns for the Confederate armed forces. With the end of the conflict in May 1865, Jones went into private business. After working in South America, he made his residence in Selma, Alabama. On June 20, 1877, he was shot as the result of a quarrel between his 7-year-old son and another man's 10-year-old son. He died in Selma the following morning.

Catesby ap Roger Jones is buried in the historic Old Live Oak Cemetery at Selma, Alabama.

See also

 John Taylor Wood, served under Jones on CSS Virginia

Notes

References
 U.S. Naval Historical Center
 

1821 births
1877 deaths
United States Navy officers
Confederate States Navy commanders
People of Virginia in the American Civil War
People murdered in Alabama
Deaths by firearm in Alabama
American people of English descent
American people of Welsh descent